Roue is a synonym for rake (character).

Roue or La Roue may also refer to:

La Roue, a 1923 film by Abel Gance
La Roue (Brussels), a district
La Roue/Het Rad metro station, in Brussels
Rõue, a village in Estonia
William James Roué (1879–1970), a naval architect famous for his design of the Bluenose fishing schooner